Miss Grand Ecuador is an Ecuadorian female national beauty pageant launched in 2021 by the Concurso Nacional de Belleza Ecuador (CNB Ecuador) organization, directed by Tahiz Panus and Miguel Panus, with the aim of selecting a country representative to participate in its parent pageant, Miss Grand International. Previously, the competition franchise belonged to Maria del Carmen Aguayo, who usually chose the runners-up or national finalists from her national pageant, Miss Ecuador, to partake in such an international competition.

Ecuador has three Miss Grand International placements; the highest is first runner-up, achieved by Andrea Aguilera in 2021, followed by Mara Topi's Top 10 finalists in 2019.

History
Ecuador made its Miss Grand International debut in 2013, when Alexandra Zulay Castillo Velasco, the national finalist of Miss Ecuador 2012, was named one of the top 20 finalists. From 2013 to 2018, the Ecuadorian franchise belonged to the Miss Ecuador organization, with one of the pageant finalists being appointed as Miss Grand Ecuador. However, only one of them qualified for the top 20 finalists on the international stage; the rest were unplaced. Later in 2019, Ecuador broke the record of non-placement after the new franchisee, the Concurso Nacional de Belleza Ecuador (CNB Ecuador), appointed a 24-year-old actress from Guayaquil, Mara Topic Verduga, to join the international contest in Venezuela, where she was ranked among the top 10 finalists as well as obtained the Best in National Costume award.

Tahiz Panus and Miguel Panus, the presidents of the CNB Ecuador, have been serving as the national directors of Miss Grand Ecuador since 2019. Under their leadership, the first edition of Miss Grand Ecuador happened on June 26, 2021, at the TC Televisión studios in the city of Guayaquil. The contest featured six national finalists from six provinces, including Cañar, El Oro, Esmeraldas, Los Ríos, Manabí, and Pichincha, of whom Andrea Aguilera from Los Ríos Province was elected the winner. Previously, Aguilera competed in the Miss Earth Ecuador 2019 pageant but did not win the main title.

However, no pageant was held to determine the titleholder in 2022; the first runner-up of the previous edition, Emilia Vásquez of Pichincha Province, was appointed to the position and expected to represent the country at Miss Grand International 2022 in Indonesia, but was later replaced by Liseth Naranjo for undisclosed reasons.  Naranjo was a former Miss Grand Ecuador 2020 but was dethroned before competing on the international stage.

Editions
The Miss Grand Ecuador pageant was separately held once in 2021, and the upcoming edition is scheduled to be held in 2023. The following table is the competition detail for such contests.

Representatives at Miss Grand International

Winner gallery

National pageant candidates

  Winner
  Runners-up
  Finalists
  Semifinalists
  Unplaced
  No representative

References

External links
 

Beauty pageants in Ecuador
Recurring events established in 2021
2021 establishments in Ecuador